William Dudley Chipley (June 6, 1840 – December 1, 1897) was an American railroad executive and politician who was instrumental in the building of the Pensacola and Atlantic Railroad and was a tireless promoter of Pensacola, his adopted city, where he was elected to one term as mayor, and later to a term as Florida state senator.

Following the American Civil War, in 1868 Chipley was one of twenty men arrested in his hometown of Columbus, Georgia, in 1868 on suspicion of participation in the murder of Radical Republican judge George W. Ashburn by the Ku Klux Klan.  Political maneuvers resulted in the dropping of all charges.

In 1877, Chipley helped Texas Rangers and Florida law officers subdue and arrest outlaw John Wesley Hardin aboard a train in Pensacola.  Hardin was subsequently returned to Texas, convicted on outstanding murder charges, and imprisoned.

Early life
Chipley was born in Columbus, Georgia, the son of Dr. William Stout Chipley and Elizabeth Fannin Chipley. Chipley's grandfather, the Rev. Stephen Chipley, was one of the founding citizens of Lexington, Kentucky. Dr. Chipley was renowned for his work relating to brain diseases and held two jobs: a professor of medicine at Transylvania University and the warden of the Eastern Asylum for the Insane in Lexington.

Chipley moved with his parents back to Lexington when he was four years old, and was raised for all of his formative years in Kentucky. He graduated from the Kentucky Military Institute and Transylvania University.

Military service

After graduation from Transylvania, he enlisted in the 9th Kentucky Infantry, fighting for the Confederacy in the Civil War. He was elevated to the position of lieutenant colonel and was wounded at the battles of Shiloh and Chickamauga before being taken prisoner at the Battle of Peachtree Creek near Atlanta. As a prisoner of war, Chipley was transported to Johnson's Island on Lake Erie in Ohio, and was interned there until the war was over. In mid-1865, he settled in Columbus and married Ann Elizabeth Billups, the daughter of a prominent planter in Phenix City, Alabama, just across the Chattahoochee River from Columbus.

Ashburn murder trial
Chipley was later implicated and charged in the murder of George W. Ashburn by the Columbus Ku Klux Klan. Ashburn, a Radical Republican member of the Georgia government, was murdered on March 31, 1868, following warnings by the KKK to cease his outspoken support for Reconstruction. In the resultant investigation into his murder, Chipley was identified by witness Amanda Patterson as one of several men who broke into the house Ashburn was staying in; Patterson also told investigators that Chipley had, prior to the murder, told her "We are going to kill old Ashburn the night of the day he speaks [at a political meeting]."

With former Confederate Vice President Alexander H. Stephens representing the defense, Chipley and his alleged co-conspirators were tried before a military court (a civil court not being used as a result of Georgia's temporary military governorship). The prosecution, aided by federal investigator Hiram C. Whitley, assembled evidence of guilt to the point that sympathetic Southern newspapers switched from outright denial of Klan guilt to diminishing the status of the crime; as the Macon Weekly Telegraph hypothesized, perhaps the defendants had intended only to tar and feather Ashburn but when he resisted, the Klan members shot him in "quasi self-defense." Northern newspapers reported the defense as resorting to tedious details in their attempt to clear the accused, with the Chicago Tribune recording the military judges as "growing somewhat weary of the great mass of trifling and irrelevant matter introduced by the defense."

Political intrigue, however, would ultimately undermine the case against Chipley and the other defendants. Stephens' connections with Democratic members of the Georgia House of Representatives lead to Democrats voting to ratify the Fourteenth Amendment, a Republican goal, which in turn caused the re-admittance of Georgia to the Union and the invalidation of the military court proceedings. As a result, Chipley and the others charged in Ashburn's death were released.

Railroad executive

Chipley entered the railroad industry shortly after the Ashburn trial. He worked for the Columbus and Rome Railroad, and later for the Baltimore and Ohio Railroad from 1873 to 1876. It was at this time that he moved to Pensacola, Florida, where he was made general manager of the Pensacola Railroad, a 45-mile line linking Pensacola with the Louisville and Nashville Railroad, its parent company from 1880 onward. Chipley was also instrumental in the promoting and building of L&N subsidiary Pensacola and Atlantic Railroad in 1881-1883, linking Pensacola and the Florida Panhandle with the eastern part of the state for the first time.  Chipley was made vice-president of the P&A.

Chipley's success in getting a railroad built through the Panhandle led the residents of Orange, Florida, to rename their town Chipley in 1882.  In the same year, the town of Chipley, Georgia, near Columbus, was named for him, after he got the tracks of the Columbus and Rome Railroad extended to that community; the town's name was changed to Pine Mountain in 1958.

Politics and death

Chipley created the Democratic Executive Committee in Muscogee County, Georgia in the late 1860s, and was its first director. He later served as director of the Florida Democratic Executive Committee.

Chipley served one term as the mayor of Pensacola (1887–1888). He also served in the Florida State Senate from 1895 to 1897, and lost his bid for United States Senator in 1896 by one vote.

While on a trip to Washington, D.C., Chipley died on December 1, 1897. He was in the middle of a trip to lobby lawmakers to base more industrial endeavors in Florida. He was buried in Columbus, while the townspeople of Pensacola erected an obelisk in the Plaza Ferdinand VII in his honor.

See also
List of mayors of Pensacola, Florida

References

External links
 Pensacola (the Naples of America) and Its Surroundings Illustrated - Promotional pamphlet and travel guide compiled by Chipley when general manager of the Pensacola Railroad, 1877.
 

19th-century American railroad executives
Mayors of Pensacola, Florida
Florida state senators
People from Columbus, Georgia
People of Kentucky in the American Civil War
Confederate States Army officers
American Civil War prisoners of war
1840 births
1897 deaths
19th-century American politicians